Dhu Alyan is a sub-district located in Huth District, 'Amran Governorate, Yemen. Dhu Alyan had a population of 925 according to the 2004 census.

References 

Sub-districts in Huth District